Rajamäki may refer to:

Place
Rajamäki (village), Finland

Surname
Antti Rajamäki (born 1952), Finnish sprinter
Kari Rajamäki (born 1948), Finnish politician
Marko Rajamäki (born 1968), Finnish football manager
Susanna Rajamäki (born 1979), Finnish athlete